Sergei Stanislavovich Arekayev (born September 22, 1978) is a Russian former professional ice hockey player.

Following seven seasons spent in the Russian Superleague, Arekayev played 98 games in the Kontinental Hockey League (KHL) with HC MVD, HC Neftekhimik Nizhnekamsk and Amur Khabarovsk.

References

External links

1978 births
Living people
Ak Bars Kazan players
Amur Khabarovsk players
HC MVD players
HC Neftekhimik Nizhnekamsk players
HC Spartak Moscow players
Metallurg Magnitogorsk players
Russian ice hockey right wingers
Severstal Cherepovets players
People from Elektrostal
Sportspeople from Moscow Oblast